John Bampfylde may refer to:

Sir John Bampfylde, 1st Baronet ( 1610–1650), English MP for Penryn
John Bampfylde (1691–1750), English MP for Devon and Exeter
John Codrington Bampfylde (1754–1796), English poet